Super Colossal is the eleventh studio album by guitarist Joe Satriani, released on March 14, 2006, through Epic Records. The album reached No. 86 on the U.S. Billboard 200 and remained on that chart for two weeks, as well as reaching the top 100 in three other countries. Super Colossal was nominated for Best Rock Instrumental Performance at the 2007 Grammy Awards, Satriani's thirteenth such nomination.

Release and touring
Recording for Super Colossal began around September 2005 and the title was announced on February 2, 2006. Touring began in North America from March to May 2006, followed by Europe from June to July.

Overview
Satriani provides detailed explanations of the story behind each track in the album's liner notes. "Crowd Chant" was originally going to be named "Party on the Enterprise" with sampled sounds of the Enterprise spacecraft from the Star Trek series. However, prior to the album's release, Satriani explained on a podcast that he was unable to acquire the legal rights to use the samples, choosing instead to replace them with his own sounds and rename the track. "Crowd Chant"'s ending theme was inspired by composer Gabriel Fauré's "Pavane in F-sharp minor, Op. 50".

"Crowd Chant" is used by various American football teams after touchdowns.  It is also a popular goal song for ice hockey teams, most notably the Minnesota Wild and the New York Islanders of the NHL. It was later featured on the soundtrack to the 2009 video game NHL 2K10, while a cover version appears in Madden NFL 11. The MLB Network TV series Quick Pitch used the song as its opening theme but replaced it with Fitz and the Tantrums's song "HandClap" in 2017.

Critical reception

Rob Theakston at AllMusic gave Super Colossal 3.5 stars out of 5, saying that Satriani "doesn't pull any new tricks out of his bag, but lets his fingers do the talking throughout most of the record." The title track was described as "big and booming", with an instantly recognizable tone and delivery. "It's So Good" was likened to Flying in a Blue Dream (1989) and Steve Vai's 1990 album Passion and Warfare, while the final track, "Crowd Chant", was criticized as being "painfully out of place" despite its catchiness.

Track listing

Personnel
Joe Satriani – guitar, keyboard, bass, engineering, production
Jeff Campitelli – drums (except tracks 6–9), percussion (except tracks 6–9)
Simon Phillips – drums (tracks 6–9), engineering
Eric Caudieux – editing, sound design
Mike Fraser – engineering, mixing, production
Rob Stefanson – engineering assistance
Stephan Nordin – engineering assistance
George Marino – mastering

Chart performance

Awards

References

External links
Super Colossal at satriani.com
In Review: Joe Satriani "Super Colossal" at Guitar Nine Records

Joe Satriani albums
2006 albums
Epic Records albums
Albums produced by Mike Fraser
Grammy Award for Best Rock Instrumental Performance